Likert may refer to:

 Rensis Likert, an American educator and organizational psychologist best known for his research on management styles
 the Likert scale developed by Rensis Likert, a measuring device used in quantitative social science
 Likert's management systems, styles of management developed by Rensis Likert